The 1971 NAIA Soccer Championship was the 13th annual tournament held by the NAIA to determine the national champion of men's college soccer among its members in the United States.

In a rematch of the previous year's final, Quincy (IL) defeated defending champions Davis & Elkins in the final, 1–0, to claim the Hawks' third NAIA national title.

For the second consecutive year, the final was  played in Dunn, North Carolina.

Qualification

For the fourth year, the tournament field remained fixed at eight teams. Unlike the previous three years, however, additional fifth- and seventh-place finals were not contested.

Bracket

See also  
 1971 NCAA Soccer Championship

References 

NAIA championships
NAIA
1971 in sports in North Carolina